The spotted sea snake (Hydrophis ocellatus) is a species of marine snake native to the waters off northern Australia.

References

Hydrophis
Reptiles of Western Australia
Reptiles of the Northern Territory
Reptiles of Queensland
Reptiles described in 1849
Taxa named by John Edward Gray
Snakes of Australia